The Confession Killer is a 2019 American true crime documentary miniseries directed by Robert Kenner and Taki Oldham. The plot revolves around the 1983 case of Henry Lee Lucas who confessed to over 200 murders in the United States. Years after his admissions, they turned out to be lies.

Cast
 Nan Cuba as Self - Journalist
 Bob Prince as Self - Retired Texas Ranger
 Hugh Aynesworth as Self - Journalist
 Phil Ryan as Self - Retired Texas Ranger
 Clemmie Schroeder as Self - Jailhouse Minister
 Vic Feazell as Self - Former District Attorney
 Mike Cox as Self - Former Texas Rangers Spokesperson
 Parker McCollough as Self - Lucas's Attorney
 Joyce Lemons as Self - Debbie's Mother
 Ninfa Sheppard Lambert as Self - Rita's Sister
 Linda Erwin as Self - Retired Homicide Detective
 Anne Gilmore as Self - Daughter of Joan Gilmore
 Larry Hawkins as Self - Retired Detective
 Truman Simons as Self - Former Sheriff's Deputy
 Jim Henderson as Self - Journalist
 Liz Flatt as Self - Debbie's Sister

Release 
The Confession Killer was released on December 6, 2019, on Netflix.

References

External links
 
 

2019 American television series debuts
2019 American television series endings
2010s American documentary television series
English-language Netflix original programming
Netflix original documentary television series
Documentary television series about crime in the United States